Karula Parish  was a rural municipality in  Valga County, Estonia.

Settlements
Villages
Kaagjärve - Käärikmäe - Karula - Kirbu - Koobassaare - Londi - Lüllemäe - Lusti - Pikkjärve - Pugritsa - Raavitsa - Rebasemõisa - Väheru - Valtina

References